Idriss ibn Muhammad ibn al-Amraoui, son of the poet Mohammed ibn Idris al-Amrawi was a Moroccan emissary who, in the service  of sultan Mohammed IV (1859–1873), visited Paris in 1860 and Spain in 1861. His arrival in France coincided with the death of Napoleon III. He wrote a rihla of that journey called Tuhfat almalik al-aziz bi-mamlakat Bariz. He gives a detailed description of his impressions. Beside prose works Al-Amraoui has also left an important diwan.

References

Bibliography
Le paradis des femmes et l'enfer des chevaux : La France de 1860 vue par l'émissaire du Sultan, La Tour d’Aigues: L'Aube, 2002 

Moroccan writers
Moroccan travel writers
19th-century Moroccan writers
Moroccan diplomats